Kemundel (Kemundelu) is a place in the Udupi district of the state of Karnataka, India. It is near to Yellur and Admar. This place is the location of the proposed  Nagarjuna Thermal Power Plant, which has been protested by the local populace.

References

Villages in Udupi district